Sharaku is a 1995 Japanese drama film directed by Masahiro Shinoda. It was entered into the 1995 Cannes Film Festival.

Cast
 Hiroyuki Sanada as Tonbo
 Frankie Sakai as Tsutaya
 Shima Iwashita as Troupe Leader
 Tsurutarō Kataoka as Goro
 Shirō Sano as Utamaro
 Riona Hazuki as Hanasato
 Toshiya Nagasawa as Tetsuzo (the future Hokusai)
 Yasosuke Bando as Matsudaira Sadanobu
 Nakamura Tomijyuro V as Gosei
 Haruko Kato as Ofuji
 Masumi Miyazaki as Gohi
 Choichiro Kawarazaki as Santo Kyoden
 Naomasa Musaka as Manager Yohei

References

External links

1995 films
1995 drama films
Japanese drama films
1990s Japanese-language films
Films directed by Masahiro Shinoda
1990s Japanese films